Emma Best is an American investigative reporter who gained national attention with their work for WikiLeaks and activist Julian Assange. Best is known for prolific filing of Freedom of Information Act (FOIA) requests on behalf of MuckRock and co-founding the whistleblower site Distributed Denial of Secrets (DDoSecrets) which resulted in Best being investigated by the Department of Homeland Security and temporarily banned from filing FOIA requests.

During the Trump administration, Best was also known for reporting on the FBI files of President Donald Trump, his associate Roger Stone, and a company owned by then-Treasury Secretary Steven Mnuchin.

Career 
Best has said that before becoming a transparency activist and investigative journalist, they worked for subcontractors hired by the Intelligence Community before becoming disillusioned. They left over concerns for source safety and bureaucratic obstruction, and have discussed disillusionment about surveillance, police militarization, and expansion of the military.

Freedom of Information Act 
Since 2016, Best has filed more than 5,000 Freedom of Information Act (FOIA) requests, including numerous requests to U.S. intelligence services and over 1,600 with the FBI, and published hundreds of articles.

In 2016, the Federal Bureau of Investigation investigated and considered prosecuting Best for their use of FOIA. According to the Calyx Institute, Best "consistently sits at or near the top of FBI's list of vexsome FOIA requesters."

In 2017, Best helped get the CIA database of 13 million pages of declassified files online. In 2019, Best and former NSA hacker Emily Crose embarked on a project to use FOIA to get documents on historical hacking incidents, called “Hacking History.”

In 2021, the FBI banned Best from filing FOIA requests, and their existing requests were closed. With the help of national security attorneys Mark Zaid and Brad Moss, the ban was lifted after several months and their requests were reopened.

WikiLeaks 
Before DDoSecrets, Best had joined a narrow group of WikiLeaks contributors before falling out with Julian Assange, accusing him, among other things, of having lied about the source of the DNC email leak, and the incomplete nature of its archive of John Podesta's emails. Best has published several of WikiLeaks' own leaked documents.

On 19 July 2016, in response to the Turkish government's purges that followed the coup attempt, WikiLeaks released 294,548 emails from Turkey's ruling Justice and Development party (AKP). Most experts agree that Phineas Fisher was behind the leak. On 21 July, WikiLeaks tweeted a link to a database which contained sensitive information, such as the Turkish Identification Number, of approximately 50 million Turkish citizens. The information was not in the files uploaded by WikiLeaks, but in files described by WikiLeaks as "the full data for the Turkey AKP emails and more", which was archived by Best, who then removed it when the personal data was discovered.

In mid-August 2016, Guccifer 2.0 expressed interest in offering a trove of Democratic e-mails to Best. Assange urged Best to decline, intimating that he was in contact with the persona's handlers, and that the material would have greater impact if he released it first.

In November 2018, they leaked sealed chat logs that were part of the case against Assange.

In April 2019, they revealed that Chelsea Manning's FBI files were central to the ongoing proceedings against Assange before the indictment was unsealed.

Distributed Denial of Secrets 
On December 3, 2018, Best co-founded Distributed Denial of Secrets with another member of the group known as The Architect. According to Best, The Architect, whom they already knew, approached them and expressed their desire to see a new platform for leaked and hacked materials, along with other relevant datasets.

In July 2020, three agents who identified themselves as part of Homeland Security Investigations visited a woman in Boston to question her about BlueLeaks, Distributed Denial of Secrets and Emma Best. The agents asked the woman about her involvement with BlueLeaks before eventually asking her to become an informant, and offered to pay for any information that led to arrests.

As of January 2021, the site hosts dozens of terabytes of data.

In February 2021, Distributed Denial of Secrets leaked 70 gigabytes of data from the far right social media platform Gab, including email addresses, passwords, and internal emails; the group referred to the action as "GabLeaks". While he did not directly accuse Best of instigating the leak, Gab CEO Andrew Torba released a statement in which he referred to the leakers as "mentally ill tranny demon hackers".

Personal life 
Best is queer and nonbinary, and is married to fellow DDoSecrets member Xan North.

References

External links 
 Distributed Denial of Secrets
Twitter
 Website

American journalists
American whistleblowers
Queer writers
Living people
Transgender women
WikiLeaks
Year of birth missing (living people)
American non-binary writers